Parks Peak can refer to two mountains in Idaho, United States:

Parks Peak (Blaine County, Idaho)
Parks Peak (Valley County, Idaho)

References